Unicon may refer to:

Unicon (unicycling), the bi-annual unicycling world championships
Unicon (programming language), a programming language descended from Icon 
Unicon (Maryland science fiction convention), a series of science fiction conventions held in Maryland 1974 through 1989
Unicon (Unicon A/S), A leading producer and supplier of ready made concrete in Denmark, www.unicon.dk , the company is part of Aalborg Portland Holding Group (Aalborg Portland)